The Ōtira River is located in the central South Island of New Zealand.

The valley of the Otira River forms the northwestern approach to Arthur's Pass, one of the three main passes across the Southern Alps.

References

Westland District
Rivers of the West Coast, New Zealand
Arthur's Pass National Park
Rivers of New Zealand